Bernadette Ségol (born 1949) is a French former trade union leader.

Born in Luzech, Ségol received a master's degree in philosophy from the University of Toulouse, then became the assistant to the general secretary of the International Textile, Garment and Leather Workers' Federation.  In 1985, she moved to Brussels to become director of Euro-FIET, the European section of the International Federation of Commercial, Clerical, Professional and Technical Employees.  In 2000, this merged into the new UNI-Europa, the European section of the Union Network International (UNI), and Ségol was elected as its first general secretary.  Under her leadership, UNI-Europa set up European Works Councils, campaigned for the Temporary Agency Workers' Directive, and worked to ensure that the Services Directive maintained workers' rights.

In 2011, Ségol was elected as general secretary of the European Trade Union Confederation, the first woman to hold the post.  She focused on campaigning against austerity.  She retired in 2015.

References

1949 births
Living people
French trade union leaders
French women trade unionists
People from Lot (department)